Dain Blanton (born November 28, 1971 in Laguna Beach, California) is an American beach volleyball player who won the gold medal in Beach Volleyball in the 2000 Olympic Games, with partner Eric Fonoimoana.  He returned to the 2004 Olympic Games in Athens, Greece with partner Jeff Nygaard, becoming the first two-time U.S. male Beach Volleyball Olympian.

Career
One of the only players in the history of volleyball to win a championship at every level of the game (collegiate, Olympic and professional).

As a high school senior in 1990, Blanton was named the Orange County Player of the Year, Most Valuable Player of the Pacific Coast League and earned all-American honors at the Junior Olympics. Blanton was also an All-State Basketball player who led Laguna Beach to the CIF Finals in 1990.

He attended Pepperdine University where he was an All-American and guided The Waves to a National Volleyball Championship in 1992 as a sophomore.

He is known for his fast serve holding the AVP record for 11 aces in a single game to 15 in Vail, Colorado in 1997.

After winning gold at the 2000 Olympics, Blanton and Fonoimoana broke their partnership because of rule changes that went into effect in 2001. (Rally or Point per Play scoring as opposed to having to traditional Serve to Score a point;  court size changed from 30x30 feet per side to 8x8 meters). Height became a deciding factor because the new rules provided an advantage for a full-time tall blocker at the net. They went separate ways in search of Big Blockers.  In the 2004 Olympics, Blanton and Nygaard were seeded eighth, but failed to advance out of pool play.

Currently Dain is the Analyst for Professional Beach Volleyball worldwide covering the FIVB (Federation of International Volleyball), AVP, NVL (National Volleyball League, and the Jose Cuervo Pro Beach Series as well as the Sideline Reporter for the NBA Los Angeles Clippers. His new career in Sports Broadcasting has involved working with ABC, NBC, ESPN, Fox Sports Net and Universal Sports Network. He is covering many sports including NBA, Beach Volleyball, MLB, College Basketball and College Football. Dain also does many motivational speaking events each year to inspire and be a role model to many.

Dain was the runner-up to Andrew Firestone on the third season of ABC television network reality show The Bachelor.

Awards and honors
 1992 NCAA National Champion (Men's Volleyball Pepperdine University)
 2000 Olympic Gold Medalist (Beach Volleyball) partner:Eric Fonoimoana
 2004 Olympian (Beach Volleyball) partner:Jeff Nygaard
 All-American NCAA Collegiate Volleyball 1994
 AVP Best Offensive Player 2003
 AVP Special Achievement 1997
 AVP Team of the Year 2003
 2015 AVCA National Champion (Women's Beach Volleyball, USC) Assistant Coach
 2016 NCAA National Champion (Women's Beach Volleyball, USC) Assistant Coach
 2017 NCAA National Champion (Women's Beach Volleyball, USC) Assistant Coach
 2021 NCAA National Champion (Women's Beach Volleyball, USC) Head Coach
 2022 NCAA National Champion (Women's Beach Volleyball, USC) Head Coach

References

External links
 
 Dain Blanton at AVP
 
 
 

1971 births
Living people
Beach volleyball players at the 2000 Summer Olympics
Beach volleyball players at the 2004 Summer Olympics
Olympic beach volleyball players of the United States
Olympic medalists in beach volleyball
Pepperdine Waves men's volleyball players
Los Angeles Clippers announcers
National Basketball Association broadcasters
American men's beach volleyball players
Medalists at the 2000 Summer Olympics